The 1847 Canterbury by-election was an uncontested election held on 15 March 1847. The by-election was brought about due to the death of the incumbent Conservative MP, James Bradshaw. It was won by the Liberal candidate Lord Albert Conyngham, who was the only declared candidate.

See also

List of United Kingdom by-elections (1832–1847)

References

1847 in England
Canterbury
1847 elections in the United Kingdom
By-elections to the Parliament of the United Kingdom in Kent constituencies
19th century in Kent
March 1847 events